A fall line (or fall zone) is the area where an upland region and a coastal plain meet and is typically prominent where rivers cross it, with resulting rapids or waterfalls. The uplands are relatively hard crystalline basement rock, and the coastal plain is softer sedimentary rock. A fall line often will recede upstream as the river cuts out the uphill dense material,  forming "c"-shaped waterfalls and exposing bedrock shoals. Because of these features, riverboats typically cannot travel any farther inland without portaging, unless locks are built.  The rapid change in elevation of the water and resulting energy release make the fall line a good location for water mills, grist mills, and sawmills.  Seeking a head of navigation with a ready supply of water power, people have long made settlements where rivers cross a fall line.

Geography

The slope of fall zones on rivers played a role in settlement patterns. For example, the fall line represents the inland limit of navigation on many rivers.  As such, many fall line cities grew around transferring people and goods between land-based and water-based transportation at this point.

Atlantic Seaboard Fall Line

The Atlantic Seaboard Fall Line, or Fall Zone, is a  escarpment where the Piedmont and Atlantic Coastal Plain meet in the eastern United States. Much of the Atlantic Seaboard fall line passes through areas where no evidence of faulting is present.

The fall line marks the geologic boundary of hard metamorphosed terrain—the product of the Taconic orogeny—and the sandy, relatively flat outwash plain of the upper continental shelf, formed of unconsolidated Cretaceous and Tertiary sediments. Examples of the Fall Zone include the Potomac River's Little Falls and the rapids in Richmond, Virginia, where the James River falls across a series of rapids down to the tidal estuary of the James River. Columbia, South Carolina is similar as well with the Congaree River.

Before navigation improvements such as locks, the fall line was often the head of navigation on rivers due to rapids and waterfalls, such as the Little Falls of the Potomac River. Numerous cities were founded at the intersection of rivers and the fall line. U.S. Route 1 links many of the fall line cities.

Mid-Atlantic and Southern U.S. fall line cities include:
Paterson, New Jersey, on the Passaic River
Trenton, New Jersey, on the Delaware River
Philadelphia, Pennsylvania, on the Schuylkill River
Wilmington, Delaware, on Brandywine Creek
Baltimore, Maryland, on the Jones Falls, Gunpowder Falls and Gwynns Falls
Washington, D.C., on the Potomac River
Fredericksburg, Virginia, on the Rappahannock River
Hanover, Virginia, on the North Anna River
Richmond, Virginia, on the James River
Petersburg, Virginia, on the Appomattox River
Weldon, North Carolina, and Roanoke Rapids, North Carolina, on the Roanoke River
Rocky Mount, North Carolina, on the Tar River
Raleigh, North Carolina, on the Neuse River
Fayetteville, North Carolina, on the Cape Fear River
Camden, South Carolina, on the Wateree River
Columbia, South Carolina, on the Congaree River
Augusta, Georgia, on the Savannah River
Milledgeville, Georgia, on the Oconee River
Macon, Georgia, on the Ocmulgee River
Columbus, Georgia, on the Chattahoochee River
Tallassee, Alabama, on the Tallapoosa River
Wetumpka, Alabama, on the Coosa River
Tuscaloosa, Alabama, on the Black Warrior River

Canada
The Laurentian Upland forms a long scarp line where it meets the Great Lakes–St. Lawrence Lowlands. Along this line numerous rivers have carved falls and canyons (listed East to West):
Saint Anne Falls and Canyon Sainte-Anne (Sainte-Anne-du-Nord River)
Chaudron à Gaudreault (Rivière aux Chiens)
Unnamed falls (Rivière du Sault à la Puce)
Canyon of the Cazeau River
Montmorency Falls (Montmorency River)
Kabir Kouba Fall (Saint-Charles River)
Chute Ford (Sainte-Anne River)
Sainte-Ursule Falls (Maskinongé River)
Chute à Magnan (Rivière du Loup)
Chutes Émery and Chute du Moulin Coutu (Rivière Bayonne)
Les sept chutes (L'Assomption River)
Dorwin Falls (Ouareau River)
Wilson Falls (Rivière du Nord)
Long Sault, now flooded by the Carillon hydroelectric generating station (Ottawa River)
The Chaudière Falls run over the unrelated Eardley Escarpment of the Ottawa-Bonnechere Graben
The Jacques-Cartier River and Saint-Maurice River lack such noticeable feature because they cross the scarp through U-shaped valleys. The falls of the lower Saint-Maurice (as well as those of the Beauport River, in Quebec City) are due to the fluvial terraces of the Saint Lawrence river rather than the Laurentian Scarp.

See also
Geologic map of Georgia (U.S. state)
Spring line settlement

References

External links
 

Geographic coordinate lists
Geomorphology